Ayodhyecha Raja, literally "The King of Ayodhya", was the first Marathi talkie, released in 1932, directed by Shantaram Rajaram Vankudre. It is based on the mythological story of Raja Harishchandra of Ayodhya and his test by sage Vishwamitra, as recounted in Valmiki's epic, Ramayana.

The film was also made as a double-version, Ayodhya Ka Raja (1932) in Hindi, making it the first double version talkie of Indian cinema, wherein Munshi Ismail Farogh wrote the Hindi dialogue, while screenwriter N.V. Kulkarni also did Marathi dialogue. India's first full-length feature film, Raja Harishchandra (1913), was also made on the same storyline.

Significance

The film was not just Prabhat Film Company's first talkie film, but also for its director, V. Shantaram. In its time, it was a leap not just in sound, song and dialogue quality and became a hit. Eventually, it turned out to be a social leap as well for the film industry, as the entry of Durga Khote, who belonged to an upper class and elite Brahmin family into Marathi cinema, paved way for other women from upper classes to enter cinema. V. Shantaram made another version film, Duniya Na Mane (Kunku in Marathi) in 1937.

After the 2003 fire at the National Archives of India, Pune in which prints of first Indian talkie Alam Ara (1931) were lost, it is also the earliest surviving talkie of Indian cinema.

Cast
 Govindrao Tembe as Harishchandra
  Durga Khote as Taramati
 Digambar as Rohitashwa
 Nimbalkar as Vishwamitra
 B.Desai as Jatadhar
 Sushila as Maid Queen
 B.Pendharkar as Ganganath
 Vinayak as Narad
 G.R. Mane as Domb

Soundtrack
Ayodhyecha Raja has music by Govindrao Tembe:
 "Shiv Shankara, Girjavaran"
 "Jai Jai Rajadiraj"; singer: Vasant Desai

References

External links

 Ayodhyecha Raja at Prabhat Film Company

1932 films
Indian black-and-white films
Films about Raja Harishchandra
Prabhat Film Company films
Films directed by V. Shantaram
Indian historical drama films
1930s historical drama films
1932 multilingual films
Indian multilingual films
1930s Marathi-language films
1932 drama films